L'Agnese va a morire, internationally released as And Agnes Chose to Die, is a 1976 Italian drama film directed by Giuliano Montaldo. It is based on a novel of the same name by Renata Viganò which won the Viareggio Prize in 1949.

Cast 
Ingrid Thulin: Agnese
Stefano Satta Flores: il comandante
Michele Placido: Tom
Aurore Clément: Rina
Ninetto Davoli: La disperata
William Berger: Clinto
Flavio Bucci: il pugliese
Rosalino Cellamare: Zero
Alfredo Pea: Tonitti 
Roger Worrod: British Officer 
Gino Santercole: Piròn 
Eleonora Giorgi: Vandina
Johnny Dorelli: Walter
Massimo Girotti: Palita 
Dina Sassoli: Minghina
Gabriella Giorgelli: Lorenza
Ornella Muti

See also 
 List of Italian films of 1976

References

External links

1976 films
Italian drama films
Films directed by Giuliano Montaldo
Films set in Italy
Films set in Emilia-Romagna
Films scored by Ennio Morricone
Italian Campaign of World War II films
1970s Italian-language films
1970s Italian films
Films about Italian resistance movement